This is a list of Azusa Pacific Cougars head football coaches.

Key

Coaches

Notes

References

Azusa Pacific Cougars
Azusa Pacific Cougars